Gypsum is a soft sulfate mineral composed of calcium sulfate dihydrate, with the chemical formula . It is widely mined and is used as a fertilizer and as the main constituent in many forms of plaster, blackboard or sidewalk chalk, and drywall. Alabaster, a fine-grained white or lightly tinted variety of gypsum, has been used for sculpture by many cultures including Ancient Egypt, Mesopotamia, Ancient Rome, the Byzantine Empire, and the Nottingham alabasters of Medieval England. Gypsum also crystallizes as translucent crystals of selenite. It forms as an evaporite mineral and as a hydration product of anhydrite.

The Mohs scale of mineral hardness defines gypsum as hardness value 2 based on scratch hardness comparison.

Etymology and history

The word gypsum is derived from the Greek word , "plaster". Because the quarries of the Montmartre district of Paris have long furnished burnt gypsum (calcined gypsum) used for various purposes, this dehydrated gypsum became known as plaster of Paris. Upon adding water, after a few dozen minutes, plaster of Paris becomes regular gypsum (dihydrate) again, causing the material to harden or "set" in ways that are useful for casting and construction.

(Thus, the word spar in mineralogy is by way of comparison to gypsum, referring to any non-ore mineral or crystal that forms in spearlike projections). In the mid-18th century, the German clergyman and agriculturalist Johann Friderich Mayer investigated and publicized gypsum's use as a fertilizer. Gypsum may act as a source of sulfur for plant growth, and in the early 19th century, it was regarded as an almost miraculous fertilizer. American farmers were so anxious to acquire it that a lively smuggling trade with Nova Scotia evolved, resulting in the so-called "Plaster War" of 1820.

Physical properties

Gypsum is moderately water-soluble (~2.0–2.5 g/L at 25 °C) and, in contrast to most other salts, it exhibits retrograde solubility, becoming less soluble at higher temperatures. When gypsum is heated in air it loses water and converts first to calcium sulfate hemihydrate, (bassanite, often simply called "plaster") and, if heated further, to anhydrous calcium sulfate (anhydrite).  As with anhydrite, the solubility of gypsum in saline solutions and in brines is also strongly dependent on NaCl (common table salt) concentration.

The structure of gypsum consists of layers of calcium (Ca2+) and sulfate ions tightly bound together. These layers are bonded by sheets of anion water molecules via weaker hydrogen bonding, which gives the crystal perfect cleavage along the sheets (in the {010} plane).

Crystal varieties

Gypsum occurs in nature as flattened and often twinned crystals, and transparent, cleavable masses called selenite. Selenite contains no significant selenium; rather, both substances were named for the ancient Greek word for the Moon.

Selenite may also occur in a silky, fibrous form, in which case it is commonly called "satin spar". Finally, it may also be granular or quite compact. In hand-sized samples, it can be anywhere from transparent to opaque. A very fine-grained white or lightly tinted variety of gypsum, called alabaster, is prized for ornamental work of various sorts. In arid areas, gypsum can occur in a flower-like form, typically opaque, with embedded sand grains called desert rose.

Occurrence
Gypsum is a common mineral, with thick and extensive evaporite beds in association with sedimentary rocks. Deposits are known to occur in strata from as far back as the Archaean eon. Gypsum is deposited from lake and sea water, as well as in hot springs, from volcanic vapors, and sulfate solutions in veins. Hydrothermal anhydrite in veins is commonly hydrated to gypsum by groundwater in near-surface exposures. It is often associated with the minerals halite and sulfur. Gypsum is the most common sulfate mineral. Pure gypsum is white, but other substances found as impurities may give a wide range of colors to local deposits.

Because gypsum dissolves over time in water, gypsum is rarely found in the form of sand.  However, the unique conditions of the White Sands National Park in the US state of New Mexico have created a  expanse of white gypsum sand, enough to supply the US construction industry with drywall for 1,000 years.
Commercial exploitation of the area, strongly opposed by area residents, was permanently prevented in 1933 when President Herbert Hoover declared the gypsum dunes a protected national monument.

Gypsum is also formed as a by-product of sulfide oxidation, amongst others by pyrite oxidation, when the sulfuric acid generated reacts with calcium carbonate. Its presence indicates oxidizing conditions. Under reducing conditions, the sulfates it contains can be reduced back to sulfide by sulfate-reducing bacteria. This can lead to accumulation of elemental sulfur in oil-bearing formations, such as salt domes, where it can be mined using the Frasch process Electric power stations burning coal with flue gas desulfurization produce large quantities of gypsum as a byproduct from the scrubbers.

Orbital pictures from the Mars Reconnaissance Orbiter (MRO) have indicated the existence of gypsum dunes in the northern polar region of Mars, which were later confirmed at ground level by the Mars Exploration Rover (MER) Opportunity.

Mining

Commercial quantities of gypsum are found in the cities of Araripina and Grajaú in Brazil; in Pakistan, Jamaica, Iran (world's second largest producer), Thailand, Spain (the main producer in Europe), Germany, Italy, England, Ireland, Canada and the United States. Large open pit quarries are located in many places including Fort Dodge, Iowa, which sits on one of the largest deposits of gypsum in the world, and Plaster City, California, United States, and East Kutai, Kalimantan, Indonesia. Several small mines also exist in places such as Kalannie in Western Australia, where gypsum is sold to private buyers for additions of calcium and sulfur as well as reduction of aluminum toxicities on soil for agricultural purposes.

The crystals thrived in the cave's extremely rare and stable natural environment. The largest of those crystals weighs  and is around 500,000 years old.

Synthesis
Synthetic gypsum is produced as a waste product or by-product in a range of industrial processes.

Desulfurization 
Flue gas desulfurization gypsum (FGDG) is recovered at some coal-fired power plants. The main contaminants are Mg, K, Cl, F, B, Al, Fe, Si, and Se. They come both from the limestone used in desulfurization and from the coal burned. This product is pure enough to replace natural gypsum in a wide variety of fields including drywalls, water treatment, and cement set retarder. Improvements in flue gas desulfurization have greatly reduced the amount of toxic elements present.

Desalination 
Gypsum precipitates onto brackish water membranes, a phenomenon known as mineral salt scaling, such as during brackish water desalination of water with high concentrations of calcium and sulfate. Scaling decreases membrane life and productivity. This is one of the main obstacles in brackish water membrane desalination processes, such as reverse osmosis or nanofiltration. Other forms of scaling, such as calcite scaling, depending on the water source, can also be important considerations in distillation, as well as in heat exchangers, where either the salt solubility or concentration can change rapidly.

A new study has suggested that the formation of gypsum starts as tiny crystals of a mineral called bassanite. This process occurs via a three-stage pathway: 
 homogeneous nucleation of nanocrystalline bassanite; 
 self-assembly of bassanite into aggregates, and 
 transformation of bassanite into gypsum.

Refinery waste 
The production of phosphate fertilizers requires breaking down calcium-containing phosphate rock with acid, producing calcium sulfate waste known as phosphogypsum (PG). This form of gypsum is contaminated by impurities found in the rock, namely fluoride, silica, radioactive elements such as radium, and heavy metal elements such as cadmium. Similarly, production of titanium dioxide produces titanium gypsum (TG) due to neutralization of excess acid with lime. The product is contaminated with silica, fluorides, organic matters, and alkalis.

Impurities in refinery gypsum waste have, in many cases, prevented them from being used as normal gypsum in fields such as construction. As a result, waste gypsum is stored in stacks indefinitely, with significant risk of leaching their contaminants into water and soil. To reduce the accumulation and ultimately clear out these stacks, research is underway to find more applications for such waste products.

Occupational safety 

People can be exposed to gypsum in the workplace by breathing it in, skin contact, and eye contact. Calcium sulfate per se is nontoxic and is even approved as a food additive, but as powdered gypsum, it can irritate skin and mucous membranes.

United States
The Occupational Safety and Health Administration (OSHA) has set the legal limit (permissible exposure limit) for gypsum exposure in the workplace as TWA 15 mg/m3 for total exposure and TWA 5 mg/m3 for respiratory exposure over an 8-hour workday. The National Institute for Occupational Safety and Health (NIOSH) has set a recommended exposure limit (REL) of TWA 10 mg/m3 for total exposure and TWA 5 mg/m3 for respiratory exposure over an 8-hour workday.

Uses

Gypsum is used in a wide variety of applications:

Construction industry
Gypsum board is primarily used as a finish for walls and ceilings, and is known in construction as plasterboard, "sheetrock", or drywall. Gypsum provides a degree of fire-resistance to these materials and glass fibers are added to their composition to accentuate this effect. Gypsum has little heat conductivity, giving its plaster some insulative properties.
Gypsum blocks are used like concrete blocks in building construction.
Gypsum mortar is an ancient mortar used in building construction.
A component of Portland cement used to prevent flash setting (too rapid hardening) of concrete.

Agriculture
Fertilizer: In the late 18th and early 19th centuries, Nova Scotia gypsum, often referred to as plaster, was a highly sought fertilizer for wheat fields in the United States. Gypsum provides two of the secondary plant macronutrients, calcium and sulfur. Unlike limestone, it generally does not affect soil pH.
Reclamation of saline soils, regardless of pH. When gypsum is added to sodic (saline) and acidic soil, the highly soluble form of boron (sodium metaborate) is converted to the less soluble calcium metaborate. Exchangeable sodium percentage is also reduced by gypsum application. The Zuiderzee Works uses gypsum for the recovered land.
Other soil conditioner uses: Gypsum reduces aluminium and boron toxicity in acidic soils. It also improves soil structure, improving water absorption and aeration.
A wood substitute in the ancient world: For example, when wood became scarce due to deforestation on Bronze Age Crete, gypsum was employed in building construction at locations where wood was previously used.
Soil water potential monitoring: a gypsum block can be inserted into soil, its electrical resistance measured to derive soil moisture.

Modeling, sculpture and art
Plaster for casting moulds and modeling.
As alabaster, a material for sculpture, it was used especially in the ancient world before steel was developed, when its relative softness made it much easier to carve. During the Middle Ages and Renaissance, it was preferred even to marble. 
In the medieval period, scribes and illuminators used it as an ingredient in gesso, which was applied to illuminated letters and gilded with gold in illuminated manuscripts.

Food and drink
A tofu (soy bean curd) coagulant, making it ultimately a significant source of dietary calcium.
Adding hardness to water used for brewing.
Used in baking as a dough conditioner, reducing stickiness, and as a baked-goods source of dietary calcium. The primary component of mineral yeast food.
Used in mushroom cultivation to stop grains from clumping together.

Medicine and cosmetics
Plaster for surgical splints.
Impression plasters in dentistry.

Other
An alternative to iron oxide in some thermite mixes.
Tests have shown that gypsum can be used to remove pollutants such as lead or arsenic from contaminated waters.

Gallery

See also
Gypcrust
Gypsum flora of Nova Scotia
Gypsum recycling
Phosphogypsum

References

External links

WebMineral data
Mineral galleries – gypsum
CDC – NIOSH Pocket Guide to Chemical Hazards

Calcium minerals
Sulfate minerals
Sedimentary rocks
Evaporite
Alchemical substances
Monoclinic minerals
Minerals in space group 15
Alabaster
Luminescent minerals
Industrial minerals